The Nordic Open was the first ever European Tour event in Denmark. The tournament was held at Simon's Golf Club in Humlebæk north of Copenhagen.

It was only held in 2003 with Ian Poulter as the winner. The tournament did not attract the audience that the promoters had expected, and a few days after the first tournament it went bankrupt.

Winners

External links
Coverage on the European Tour's official site

Former European Tour events
Golf tournaments in Denmark
2003 establishments in Denmark
2003 disestablishments in Denmark